Simon Peregrine Gauvain Murray, Baron Murray of Blidworth (born 2 August 1974) is a British barrister and politician. He was appointed a UK Conservatives life peer in the House of Lords, serving initially as Minister of State at the Home Office. On 21 October 2022, to facilitate his ministerial role, he was created Baron Murray of Blidworth, of Blidworth in the County of Nottinghamshire.

Murray was educated at the University of St Andrews and called to the English bar in 2000: he practised public law at 39 Essex Chambers. 

He is a Conservative member of Gedling Borough Council, representing Newstead Abbey ward.  

Murray married Amelia May Beaumont (born 1983), a granddaughter of the Baron Beaumont of Whitley, at the Temple Church, London, on 4 October, 2007. The couple have two children.

References 

1974 births
English barristers
Members of the Inner Temple
Conservative Party (UK) life peers
Life peers created by Charles III
Conservative Party (UK) councillors
Alumni of the University of St Andrews
Living people